Presidential elections were held in the Nagorno-Karabakh Republic on 11 August 2002. The result was a victory for incumbent President Arkadi Ghukasyan, who received 89% of the vote.

Results

References

Nagorno
Nagorno
2002 in the Nagorno-Karabakh Republic
Presidential elections in the Republic of Artsakh